St. Michaels is a Liverpool City Council Ward within the Liverpool Riverside Parliamentary constituency. The population of this ward at the 2011 census was 12,991. It was formed for the 2004 Municipal elections from the former Aigburth and Dingle wards.

History

All three seats in the ward are held by the Green Party.  The ward has returned seven Councillors since it was formed 2004. John Coyne defected to the Green Party from the Liberal Democrats in 2006 and was re-elected with the Green Party twice: in 2007 and 2011.  Cllr Sharon Green resigned from the Liberal Democrat whip to sit as an Independent on 6 May 2011 following the suspension of former leader Warren Bradley from the party.

Councillors

 indicates seat up for re-election after boundary changes.

 indicates change in affiliation.

 indicates seat up for re-election.

Election results

Elections of the 2010s

May 2019

May 2018

May 2016

May 2015

May 2014

May 2012

May 2011

May 2010

Elections of the 2000s

May 2008

May 2007

May 2006

June 2004

Notes

• italics denote the sitting councillor • bold denotes the winning candidate

References

Wards of Liverpool